Cornu de Sus may refer to several villages in Romania:

 Cornu de Sus, a village in Cornu, Prahova
 Cornu de Sus, a village in Dumbrava, Prahova